The Communauté de communes du Val de Somme  is a communauté de communes in the Somme département and in the Hauts-de-France région of France. Its seat is Corbie. Its area is 246.4 km2, and its population was 26,646 in 2018.

Composition
The communauté de communes consists of the following 33 communes:

Aubigny
Baizieux
Bonnay
Bresle
Bussy-lès-Daours
Cachy
Cerisy
Chipilly
Corbie
Daours
Fouilloy
Franvillers
Gentelles
Hamelet
Heilly
Hénencourt
Lahoussoye
Lamotte-Brebière
Lamotte-Warfusée
Le Hamel
Marcelcave
Méricourt-l'Abbé
Morcourt
Pont-Noyelles
Ribemont-sur-Ancre
Sailly-Laurette
Sailly-le-Sec
Treux
Vaire-sous-Corbie
Vaux-sur-Somme
Vecquemont
Villers-Bretonneux
Warloy-Baillon

See also 
Communes of the Somme department

References

Val de Somme
Val de Somme